Eastman is a city in Dodge County, Georgia, United States. The population was 4,962 at the 2010 census. The city was named after William Pitt Eastman, a native of Massachusetts who purchased a large tract of land along the Macon to Brunswick Railroad, and settled a city on the site.

In the 19th century, this was a center of the timber and sawmill industry. During the Great Depression in 1937, the first Stuckey's Pecan Shoppe, once well-known along roadways throughout the United States, was founded in Eastman.

History
The first permanent settlement of the area took place in 1840. The population continued to grow when, in 1869, a station was built for the newly constructed Macon and Brunswick Railroad which passed through the area, stimulating an economic boom. The settlement was originally named Levison and was renamed Eastman by December 1869.
Eastman was designated as the seat of newly formed Dodge County in 1871. It was incorporated as a town in 1873 and as a city in 1905. Eastman is named for W. P. Eastman, who, with W. E. Dodge, presented the county with a courthouse.

During that same time period, Ira Roe Foster, former Quartermaster General of Georgia, operated a sawmill in Dodge County. In 1869, Foster built a residence in what would become Eastman. Foster was one of many who came to the area to participate in the timber and sawmill boom.

During the boom, it was estimated that, on average, there was one mill every two miles along the industrial corridor created by the Macon and Brunswick Railroad. Unlike earlier eras, when timber was transported downstream in large river rafts, sawmills along the industrial corridor shipped their timber by rail. In his book The New South Comes to Wiregrass Georgia 1860-1910, author Mark V. Wetherington states: "Ira R. Foster shipped lumber to Brunswick, where it was loaded onto timber schooners and transported to international markets like Liverpool, Rio de Janeiro, and Havana." When Eastman was incorporated in 1872, Foster served as its first mayor.

In the early years of the 20th century, racial tensions increased between the white and black communities in and about Eastman, resulting in a number of documented lynchings. In one instance, a man misidentified as the rapist Ed Claus was murdered before the real Claus was identified, apprehended, and lynched. In 1919, rumors that local blacks were intending to rise up and exterminate white residents, led to the murder of Eli Cooper and the burning of several black churches, which were believed to be the focal point of the uprising.

Geography
Eastman is located in the center of Dodge County at  (32.197760, -83.179271). U.S. Route 23 passes through the center of town, leading northwest  to Cochran and southeast  to McRae-Helena. U.S. Route 341 bypasses the city on the southwest, leading west  to Hawkinsville and southeast with US 23 to McRae-Helena. Sugar Creek runs to the southwest of the city.

Demographics

2020 census

As of the 2020 United States census, there were 5,658 people, 1,916 households, and 1,343 families residing in the city.

2000 census
As of the census of 2000, there were 13,541 people, 5,261 households, and 1,318 families residing in the city. The racial makeup of the city was 60.28% White, 37.35% African American, 0.24% Native American, 0.48% Asian, 0.06% Pacific Islander, 1.16% from other races, and 0.44% from two or more races. Hispanic or Latino of any race were 1.80% of the population.

There were 2,154 households, out of which 27.2% had children under the age of 18 living with them, 37.9% were married couples living together, 19.9% had a female householder with no husband present, and 38.8% were non-families. 35.5% of all households were made up of individuals, and 15.5% had someone living alone who was 65 years of age or older.  The average household size was 2.28 and the average family size was 2.96.

In the city, the population was spread out, with 29.5% under the age of 18, 8.5% from 18 to 24, 24.6% from 25 to 44, 21.1% from 45 to 64, and 16.3% who were 65 years of age or older.  The median age was 34 years. For every 100 females, there were 92.9 males.  For every 100 females age 18 and over, there were 77.4 males.

The median income for a household in the city was $23,604, and the median income for a family was $30,500. Males had a median income of $27,292 versus $20,497 for females. The per capita income for the city was $14,332.  About 20.2% of families and 23.5% of the population were below the poverty line, including 33.1% of those under age 18 and 25.0% of those age 65 or over.

Climate

Major highways
U.S. Route 23
U.S. Route 341
Georgia State Route 27
Georgia State Route 46
Georgia State Route 87
Georgia State Route 117

Recreation
Eastman has few recreational activities. The Dodge County Golf Club has a 9-hole golf course, a swimming pool and private golf cart selection. It is positioned next to the railroad tracks that run through the town. It also has a public baseball field located at the former Boys & Girls Club. The Eastman-Dodge County Recreational Fields, located along the Eastman-Dublin Highway (Highway 117), offers the following public sports for kids: football, baseball, tee ball, cheerleading, and soccer.

Education

Dodge County School District
Dodge County students in kindergarten to twelfth grades are in the Dodge County School District, which consists of a pre-K school, two elementary schools, a middle school, and a high school. The district has 210 full-time teachers and over 3,500 students.

Dodge PreK School
South Dodge Elementary School
North Dodge Elementary School
Dodge County Middle School
Dodge County High School

Higher education

Middle Georgia State University — Georgia Aviation Campus (previously known as Georgia Aviation Technical College before it merged with the Middle Georgia College).

Peabody School
Peabody School, also known as Peabody High School, is an historic school building located on Herman Avenue in Eastman, Georgia. Built in 1938, it was designed by Eastman-born American architect Edward Columbus Hosford, who is noted for the courthouses and other buildings that he designed in Florida, Georgia and Texas. In the days of segregation, it was an all-black public school. It was closed in 1970 and its students were integrated into Dodge County High School and other formerly all-white public schools in Dodge County.

On November 20, 2004, the building was added to the National Register of Historic Places. It was then vacant and in private ownership.

Notable people 
Terry Coleman, Speaker of the House for 2003-2004 Legislative Session of Georgia General Assembly
Leonard Floyd, linebacker for NFL's Los Angeles Rams, formerly Chicago Bears
Ira Roe Foster, 19th century polymath, first mayor of Eastman, Quartermaster General of the State of Georgia, state senator and representative, brigadier general in Georgia Militia, built a sawmill in Dodge County  
Edward Columbus Hosford, architect that created courthouses and later in life constructed specialized buildings. The first courthouse he built was the Dodge County Courthouse (1908) and the last building was the Peabody School (1938).
Martha Hudson, Olympic athlete who won the gold medal in 4 × 100 metre relay at 1960 Summer Olympic Games in Rome
Hank Mobley, hard bop and soul jazz tenor saxophonist and composer
Hugh Royer, Jr., professional golfer who played on PGA Tour in 1950s, 1960s and 1970s
Tempest Storm, stripper born Annie Blanche Banks, burlesque star, and motion picture actress
Scott Stuckey, filmmaker and record producer in Washington, D.C.; creator of children's television show Pancake Mountain
W. S. Stuckey, Jr., Democratic Party member of United States House of Representatives who represented Georgia's 8th congressional district (1967–1977), president of Stuckey's (1958–1966) and later chairman of the board
W. S. Stuckey, Sr., founded Stuckey's in 1937

References

External links

 City of Eastman official website
 Eastman-Dodge County Chamber of Commerce
 Orphans Cemetery historical marker

Cities in Georgia (U.S. state)
Cities in Dodge County, Georgia
County seats in Georgia (U.S. state)
1871 establishments in Georgia (U.S. state)